In cryptography, a multi-party fair exchange protocol is protocol where parties accept to deliver an item if and only if they receive an item in return.

Definition 

Matthew K. Franklin and Gene Tsudik suggested in 1998 the following classification:

See also 

Secure multi-party computation

References

Cryptographic protocols